Dreaming is the debut extended play by South Korean girl group April. The album was released digitally and physically on August 24, 2015 and contains six tracks with the lead single, "Dream Candy". It marks leader Somin's only release prior to her departure from the group on November 9, 2015 due to her wish of continuing with her studies.

Background and release
On February 9, 2015, DSP media announced that they will debut a girl group that will be the next generation of Fin.K.L and Kara.

In July 2015, DSP Media announced the members of April through a series of teasers along with the group's logo and mascot, which was chosen through an open logo contest. In early August 2015, DSP Media confirmed that April would debut on August 24 with the mini-album Dreaming.

Promotion
On August 24, 2015, the group debuted through Naver's V app through their showcase "April Debut Showcase–Live", during which they released the mini-album Dreaming.

On August 24, 2015, April released the music video for the EP's lead single, "Dream Candy". They had their debut stage on the show on August 25. On September 11, 2015, April released a special choreography music video of lead single "Dream Candy", filmed in downtown Seoul.

Track listing

Release history

References

2015 EPs
Korean-language EPs
April (girl group) albums
Kakao M EPs
DSP Media albums